Everybody's Fine is a 2009 American drama film written and directed by Kirk Jones, and starring Robert De Niro, Drew Barrymore, Sam Rockwell and Kate Beckinsale. It is a remake of Giuseppe Tornatore's Italian film Everybody's Fine. In Brazil, Russia and Japan, the film was released direct-to-DVD.

Plot

Frank Goode, a recently widowed retiree, is getting ready for his children to come visit him. One by one though, they call to cancel on him at the last minute. Feeling a bit down by the rejections, Frank decides to head out on a cross-country trip, visiting each of his kids.

Despite warnings from his doctor, Frank takes a train to New York City, to see one of his sons, David. David does not appear to be home and never shows up so Frank leaves him a card and leaves town to see his other children. While he is waiting for David, he sees one of David's paintings in a nearby art gallery window.

His next visit is to daughter Amy in Chicago, who tells him it is a bad time to visit. She had turned down her father's earlier invitation to visit, saying that her son Jack was sick. However, once he gets to Amy's house, Frank realizes Jack was not sick and Amy was just making up an excuse. Frank hits a few golf balls with Jack in the yard of their impressive suburban home. Dinner is uncomfortable with tension between Jack and his father. The next morning, Frank accompanies Amy to her fancy downtown office and hears her agency's pitch for a TV ad. She takes him to the train station to visit his son Robert in Denver. While waiting, Amy introduces her father to a male co-worker.

As Frank travels to each of his children's homes, the film cuts to phone conversations between the siblings. David is in some type of trouble in Mexico, and Amy is going there to find out what is happening; the sisters and Robert agree to not tell their father about David until they know for sure.

Frank arrives in Denver expecting to see Robert conduct the city's orchestra. It turns out Robert is "only" a percussionist. Robert also tells Frank his visit is at a bad time, as the orchestra is flying to Europe the next day, but this is a lie. So, within hours Frank prepares to take a bus to Las Vegas to visit his daughter Rosie. Frank is adamant that each visit be a surprise, but Robert calls Rosie to warn her of his arrival.

After missing his bus, Frank arrives in Las Vegas late, catching a ride part-way from a female truck driver. In a lonely hall of the train station, during an encounter with a drug addict, Frank offers money to the drug addict. He takes it but they get into a quarrel about him being grateful for Frank's gesture. Through physical force, the drug addict tries to take all of Frank's money but fails. As a result, Frank's medicine bottle falls on the floor. To retaliate, the addict stomps on the medicine and crushes them. Frank scrapes up some of the crushed pills because he must take his medicine on a daily basis. He calls his doctor for a prescription refill but does not tell the doctor that he is traveling against doctor's advice. He has a dream that David is in trouble.

Rosie meets him at the station in a stretch limo and tells him she was in a big show that ended the previous week. She takes him to her huge, fancy apartment, where her friend Jilly brings over her baby for babysitting. Frank overhears a message being left on an answering machine, indicating the apartment is actually borrowed from Rosie's friend. During dinner, Frank asks Rosie why his adult children never talked to him and told him things, when they told their mother everything. She reveals that they were not comfortable opening up to him because he always expected too much of them and he was never a good listener. Frank is not comfortable, having a feeling that all his kids are lying to him and that something is wrong about David.

Frank flies back home but — without any more pills — he has a heart attack in the plane's lavatory. Frank has another dream of his kids as young children and deduces each of their secrets by way of confronting them: Amy is separated from her husband which caused the tension between him and his son, Robert lied about going to Europe and Rosie is really bisexual, as well as the mother of the child Jilly brought over. Frank awakens in hospital, with Amy, Robert and Rosie around his bedside. They finally reveal that David had died from an overdose and had been depressed. During the night, Frank has a vision about a young David being in his hospital room. Frank tells him that he would have been happy about him anyway and that he was sorry. An older David reassures him that it was not his fault and leaves.

After recovering, Frank visits his wife's grave and talks to her. He tells her all about the kids and his regrets about pushing them too much and not trying to understand them more. Frank goes back to the art gallery below David's apartment to buy David's painting, but it has already been sold. The girl at the desk tells him that if any of David's art comes through, she will let him know. After he leaves, she runs out to tell Frank about how great his son was, upon realizing the family connection after reading the contact info he left. She shows him another painting by David that is more appropriate to him — a landscape showing PVC-covered power lines made out of glue and macaroni in homage to Frank's career. The last scene shows the family at Christmas. All three children are around the house helping cook and decorate the tree. It is also revealed that Rosie and Jilly are a couple and are raising the baby together. Frank finally walks into the dining room, and they happily eat together.

Cast
 Robert De Niro as Frank Goode
 Drew Barrymore as Rosie Goode
 Mackenzie Milone as Young Rosie
 Kate Beckinsale as Amy Goode
 Lily Mo Sheen as Young Amy
 Sam Rockwell as Robert Goode
 Seamus Davey-Fitzpatrick as Young Robert
 Austin Lysy as David Goode
 Chandler Frantz as Young David
 Katherine Moennig as Jilly, Rosie's partner
 Melissa Leo as Colleen, truck driver
 Lucian Maisel as Jack, Amy's Son
 Damian Young as Jeff, Amy's estranged husband
 James Frain as Tom, Amy's current partner
 Sonja Stuart as Jean Goode
 Mimi Lieber provides Jean Goode's voice

Production
Filming took place in Connecticut and New York City, including several scenes filmed at Yale University in New Haven, Connecticut. Scenes set in a concert hall were filmed at Yale University's Woolsey Hall, and featured the New Haven Symphony Orchestra.

Reception

Critical reaction
The film received mixed reviews from film critics. Review aggregator Rotten Tomatoes gives the film a score of 48% based on reviews from 143 critics, with an average rating of 5.34/10. The website's critical consensus reads, "A calm, charismatic performance from Robert De Niro nearly saves the movie, but ultimately, Everybody's Fine has the look and feel of a stereotypical Christmas dramedy." On Metacritic, which assigns a weighted average score out of 100 to reviews from film critics, the film has a rating score of 47 based on 25 reviews, indicating "mixed or average reviews".

Michael Medved gave Everybody's Fine two stars out of four, calling the film "...bleak, deeply depressive, and utterly depressing..." But he also added that "DeNiro's acting is intense and moving as always."

Overall, the critic's consensus praises Robert De Niro for having "intensity and presence that shines through even when he's not playing Travis Bickle/Jake LaMotta types, "but the movie becomes overly sentimental, and the supporting players aren't given three-dimensional characters to play."

Box office
The film "unspooled in 10th [place] with $4 million." As of December 6, the film has grossed $4,027,000. It closed on December 24, 2009 after a brief three-week run.

Awards
 
Everybody's Fine was nominated for a GLAAD Media Award for Outstanding Film – Wide Release. Drew Barrymore also received the Vanguard Award at the 21st GLAAD Media Awards ceremony, in part due to her performance in the film.

Soundtrack
Paul McCartney wrote the ballad "(I Want to) Come Home" for the film after seeing an advance screening. Though he wrote the song from the perspective of De Niro's character, afterwards, he realized it could also be heard from the adult children's view. It led to a Golden Globe nomination for Best Song.

Home media
Everybody's Fine was released on DVD by Walt Disney Studios Home Entertainment on February 23, 2010. A Blu-ray was planned but wasn't released until 2012 via Lionsgate.

References

External links
 
 
 
 
 

2009 films
2009 drama films
2009 LGBT-related films
2000s adventure drama films
2000s Christmas drama films
2000s drama road movies
American adventure drama films
American Christmas drama films
American LGBT-related films
American remakes of Italian films
American drama road movies
Female bisexuality in film
Films about families
Films about old age
Films set in Chicago
Films set in Colorado
Films set in the Las Vegas Valley
Films set in New York City
Films shot in Connecticut
Films shot in New York City
Films directed by Kirk Jones
Films scored by Dario Marianelli
2000s English-language films
2000s American films